Patricia Jane Jordan (born December 7, 1930) was a registered nurse and political figure in British Columbia. She represented North Okanagan in the Legislative Assembly of British Columbia from 1966 to 1982 as a Social Credit member.

She was born Patricia Jane Laidman in Vernon, British Columbia, the daughter of John William Laidman and Eva Maud Wiseman, and was educated in Vernon, at the University of British Columbia and at the Vancouver General Hospital School of Nursing. In 1954, she married Dr. Laurance T. Jordan. She served in the provincial cabinet as a minister without portfolio and as Minister of Tourism. Jordan retired from politics in 1982.

References 

1930 births
British Columbia Social Credit Party MLAs
Canadian nurses
Canadian women nurses
Women government ministers of Canada
Living people
Members of the Executive Council of British Columbia
People from Vernon, British Columbia
Tourism ministers of British Columbia
University of British Columbia alumni
Women MLAs in British Columbia
20th-century Canadian politicians
20th-century Canadian women politicians